Bihastina albolucens is a moth in the family Geometridae first described by Louis Beethoven Prout in 1916. It is found in western Western New Guinea.

References

Moths described in 1916
Asthenini
Moths of New Guinea